Cloudlife (stylized as cLOUDLIFE) is a collaborative EP by Jel, Main Attrakionz, and Zachg. It was released on Rad Reef in March 2012. The EP was named in homage to Clouddead.

Critical reception

David Reyneke of Potholes in My Blog described the EP as "a quick listen for any of you out there that are struggling to keep up with Main Attrakionz's already vast catalog." Philip Mlynar of MTV said, "It's a canny, cross-generational union, with Mondre M.A.N. and Squadda's raps meshing with beats by Jel and Zachg." Brandon Soderberg of Spin wrote, "All four of cLOUDLIFEs songs are just as bizarre and inspired." He praised the EP's final song "Take Her Shoppin" and commented that the song "best captures Main Attrakionz's drifting, surprisingly emotive rapping."

Track listing

Personnel
Credits adapted from the Bandcamp liner notes.

 Main Attrakionz – vocals
 Zachg – vocals (3), production (2, 4), mixing (2, 4), recording
 Jel – production (1, 3), mixing (1, 3)
 Odd Nosdam – mixing (1, 3)
 Matthewdavid – mastering

References

External links
 Cloudlife on Bandcamp

2012 EPs
Alternative hip hop EPs
Albums produced by Jel (music producer)